Basler Straße is an U-Bahn station in Munich on the U3. It was opened on 1 June 1991.

References

Munich U-Bahn stations
Railway stations in Germany opened in 1991